Scabricola splendidula is a species of sea snail, a marine gastropod mollusc in the family Mitridae, the miters or miter snails.

Description
Small shells, about 15 mm. Teleoconch with 6 or 7 whorls. Reddish-brown.

Distribution
Philippine Islands and the Solomon Islands, 20-183 m.

References

External links
 Salisbury R. & Guillot de Suduiraut E. 2003. Three new deep-water miters (Gastropoda: Prosobranchia: Mitridae) from the Western Indo-Pacific with a new name for Mitra millepunctata Schepman, 1911. Novapex 4(1): 1-9
 edosov A., Puillandre N., Herrmann M., Kantor Yu., Oliverio M., Dgebuadze P., Modica M.V. & Bouchet P. (2018). The collapse of Mitra: molecular systematics and morphology of the Mitridae (Gastropoda: Neogastropoda). Zoological Journal of the Linnean Society. 183(2): 253-337

Mitridae
Gastropods described in 2003